Prem ( Love) is a 1995 Indian Hindi-language romantic drama film directed by Satish Kaushik and cinematography by Baba Azmi and Chota K. Naidu. It stars Sanjay Kapoor and Tabu in dual roles, and deals with the concept of reincarnation. Shekhar Kapoor was initially attached to direct the film before Kaushik was contracted. The film was a box office flop.

Plot
Sanjay Verma is an eligible young man, who has been having hallucinations of a past life as Shantanu. He travels to a small community and meets with Sonia Verma, and recognizes her as the girl named Lachi in his hallucinations. Convinced, that they were lovers from a past life, he attempts in vain to impress this upon Sonia, who is engaged, and is to be married to Vikram Minocha. However Sanjay finally wins her over and united at the end.

Cast
 Sanjay Kapoor as Shantanu / Sanju Verma
 Tabu as Lachi / Sonya Jaitley
 Aruna Irani as Panna
 Amrish Puri as Vanraja
 Deepak Tijori as Vikram Minocha
 Saeed Jaffrey as R. K. Jaitley,Sonya's father
 Dalip Tahil as Ratan Minocha
 Akash Khurana as S.P. Verma,Sanju's father
 Beena Banerjee as Sumitra Verma,Sanju's mother
 Sunita Dhingra as Rumila Gupta aka Bubly,Sanju's friend
 Navneet Nishan as Vanrani
 Govind Namdev as Chacha Sher Ali
 Raju Kher as Mr.Wilson, British Commanding Officer
 Bob Christo as British Senior Officer
 Chandrakant Gokhale as Old bangharu baba
 Yusuf Khurram as tribal Damaru
 Sudhir

Production
Mani Ratnam and Shekhar Kapur both turned down the chance to direct the film before Satish Kaushik was finalised.

Songs
"Maine Jee Liya Mar Liya Prem Kar Liya" - Nalin Dave, Alka Yagnik
"Teraa Meraa Prem Hai Tab Se" - Alka Yagnik, Nalin Dev
"Saat Janam Saat Vachan Saat Samandar" - Nalin Dave
"Ye Dharti Ye Ambar Jab Se" (Male) - Nalin Dave
"Ye Dharti Ye Ambar Jab Se" (Female) - Alka Yagnik
"Ho Meree Chudiya Bajee Chhan Chhan" - Alka Yagnik, Nalin Dev
"Tum Khubsurat Ho Tum Haseen Ho" - Nalin Dave
"Do Teri Akhiya Do Meri Akhiya" - Alka Yagnik, Nalin Dave
"Prem Kar Liya" - Nalin Dev, Alka Yagnik
"Log Isiko Kahate Hain Ishk Mohabbat Pyaar" - Alka Yagnik
"Ek Baat Hui Kal Rat Hui" - Nalin Dave, Alka Yagnik
"Hai Meri Ankhiyo Ne Sapna Dekha Re" - Alka Yagnik
"Hai Meri Ankhiyo Ne Sapna Dekha Re" (2) - Alka Yagnik

References

External links
 
 

1995 films
1990s Hindi-language films
Films about reincarnation
Films scored by Laxmikant–Pyarelal